Johnnie R. Turner is an American politician. She is a Democrat who represented District 85 in the Tennessee House of Representatives from January 11, 2010, when she succeeded her husband, Representative Larry Turner, until 2018, when she decided not to seek another term.

Education
Turner earned her BS from LeMoyne–Owen College, attended post-graduate studies at the University of Tennessee, and earned her MEd from the University of Memphis.

Elections
2012 Turner was challenged in the August 2, 2012 Democratic Primary, winning with 5,442 votes (78.6%), and was unopposed for the November 6, 2012 General election, winning with 22,690 votes.
2010 Turner was challenged in the August 5, 2010 Democratic Primary, winning with 6,790 votes (64.6%), and won the November 2, 2010 General election with 14,674 votes (87.6%) against Republican nominee Edgar Babian.

References

External links
Official page at the Tennessee General Assembly
Campaign site

Johnnie Turner at Ballotpedia
Johnnie R. Turner at OpenSecrets

Place of birth missing (living people)
Year of birth missing (living people)
Living people
African-American state legislators in Tennessee
African-American women in politics
LeMoyne–Owen College alumni
Democratic Party members of the Tennessee House of Representatives
Politicians from Memphis, Tennessee
University of Memphis alumni
University of Tennessee alumni
Women state legislators in Tennessee
21st-century American politicians
21st-century American women politicians
21st-century African-American women